Paula Pereira may refer to:

 Paula Pereira (actress) (born 1967), Brazilian actress
 Paula B Pereira (born 1988), Brazilian badminton player

See also
 Paulo Pereira (disambiguation)
 Pablo Pereira (disambiguation)